The Centurion Bank of Punjab (formerly Centurion Bank and Bank of Punjab) was an Indian  private sector bank that provided retail and corporate banking services. It operated on a strong nationwide franchise of 403 branches and had over 5,000 employees. The bank listed its shares on the major Indian stock exchanges and on the Luxembourg Stock Exchange. On 23 May 2008, HDFC Bank acquired Centurion Bank of Punjab.

History
Centurion Bank was incorporated on 30 June 1994 and received its certificate of Commencement of Business on 20 July. Centurion Bank was a joint venture between 20th Century Finance Corporation and its associates, and Keppel Group of Singapore through Kephinance Investment (Mauritius). Centurion had a network of ten branches, which grew to 29 branches the next year. Also in 1995 Centurion Bank amalgamated 20th Century Finance Corporation.

On 29 June 2005, the boards of directors of Centurion Bank and Bank of Punjab agreed to a  merger of the two banks. The combined bank took as its name Centurion Bank of Punjab. Bank of Punjab also had been founded in 1994. In 2007, Centurion Bank of Punjab acquired Thrissur-based Lord Krishna Bank, and soon it was acquired by HDFC Bank, which was also incidentally begun in 1994.

Defunct banks of India
Banks established in 1994
Indian companies established in 1994
Banks disestablished in 2005
Indian companies disestablished in 2005